Bailian Xijiao Shopping Mall is a large outdoor shopping center classified as a super-regional shopping mall, in Shanghai, China. It is located at No. 88 Xianxia Road, Changning District. It is owned and built by Bailian Group. Anchors include supermarkets, department stores, professional stores, themed restaurants, specialty stores, entertainment and fitness and gyms including the Friendship Department Store, Century Lianhua, HOLA Teli House, Decathlon, and Yongle Home Appliances.

External links
Official website (in Chinese)

References

Shopping malls in Shanghai